Golden Time is a 24-episode anime television series based on the light novel series written by Yuyuko Takemiya. The anime series is produced by J.C.Staff and directed by Chiaki Kon, with scripts by Fumihiko Shimo and character design by Shinya Hasegawa. The series aired in Japan between October 3, 2013 and March 27, 2014.

The show had two opening and ending themes, sung by Yui Horie. For the first 12 episodes, the opening theme is "Golden Time" and the ending theme is "Sweet & Sweet Cherry".

Episode list

References

Golden Time